The 1999–00 LEN Champions League was the 37th edition of LEN's premier competition for men's water polo clubs. It ran from 27 October 1999 to 27 May 2000, and it was contested by 28 teams. The Final Four (semifinals, final, and third place game) took place on May 26 and May 27 in Bečej.

Preliminary round

Blue Group

Red Group

Final Four (Bečej)

Final standings

See also
1999–00 LEN Cup Winners' Cup
1999–00 LEN Cup

LEN Champions League seasons
Champions League
1999 in water polo
2000 in water polo